Focal seizures (also called partial seizures and localized seizures) are seizures which affect initially only one hemisphere of the brain. The brain is divided into two hemispheres, each consisting of four lobes – the frontal, temporal, parietal and occipital lobes. A focal seizure is generated in and affects just one part of the brain – a whole hemisphere or part of a lobe. Symptoms will vary according to where the seizure occurs. When seizures occur in the frontal lobe the patient may experience a wave-like sensation in the head. When seizures occur in the temporal lobe, a feeling of déjà vu may be experienced. When seizures are localized to the parietal lobe, a numbness or tingling may occur. With seizures occurring in the occipital lobe, visual disturbances or hallucinations have been reported.

Types
As of 2017, focal seizures are split into two main categories, focal onset aware, and focal onset impaired awareness. What was previously termed a secondary generalised seizure is now termed a focal to bilateral seizure.

In focal onset aware seizures, a small part of one of the lobes may be affected and the person remains conscious. This can often be a precursor to a larger focal onset impaired awareness seizure. When this is the case, the focal aware seizure is usually called an aura.

A focal impaired awareness seizure affects a larger part of the hemisphere and the person may lose consciousness.

If a focal seizure spreads from one hemisphere to the other side of the brain, this will give rise to a focal to bilateral seizure. The person will become unconscious and may experience a tonic clonic seizure. When people have multiple focal seizures they generally have a condition known as temporal lobe epilepsy. (A generalized seizure is one that involves both sides of the brain from the onset.)

Simple partial seizures

Simple partial seizures are seizures which affect only a small region of the brain, often the temporal lobes or structures found there, such as the hippocampi. People who have focal aware seizures remain conscious. Focal aware seizures often precede larger focal impaired awareness seizures, where the abnormal electrical activity spreads to a larger area of the brain. This can result in a tonic-clonic seizure.

Presentation

Simple partial seizures are a very subjective experience, and the symptoms vary greatly between people. Since symptoms can be subtle, diagnosis can be delayed by months or years. The symptoms of these seizures can also be misconstrued as auras, especially for epilepsy patients with multiple types of seizure diagnosis. This is due to the varying locations of the brain in which the seizures originate (e.g., Rolandic). A simple partial seizure may go unnoticed by others or shrugged off by the patient as merely a "funny turn." Focal aware seizures usually start suddenly and are very brief, typically lasting 60 to 120 seconds.

Some common symptoms of a simple partial seizure, when the person is awake, are:
 preserved consciousness
 sudden and inexplicable feelings of fear, anger, sadness, happiness or nausea
 sensations of falling or movement
 experiencing of unusual feelings or sensations
 altered sense of hearing, smelling, tasting, seeing, and tactile perception (sensory illusions or hallucinations), or feeling as though the environment is not real (derealization) or dissociation from the environment or self (depersonalization)
 a sense of spatial distortion—things close by may appear to be at a distance
 déjà vu (familiarity) or jamais vu (unfamiliarity)
 laboured speech or inability to speak at all
 usually the event is remembered in detail

When a seizure occurs during sleep, the person will often become semi-conscious and act out a dream they were having while engaging with the real environment as normal. Objects and people usually appear normal or only slightly distorted to them, and will be able to communicate with them on an otherwise normal level. However, since the person is still acting in a dream-like state, they will assimilate any hallucinations or delusions into their communication, often speaking to a hallucinatory person or speaking of events or thoughts pertaining to their dream or a hallucination.

While-asleep symptoms include:
 onset usually in REM sleep
 dream-like state
 appearance of full consciousness
 hallucinations or delusions
 behavior or visions typical in dreams
 ability to engage with the environment and other people as in full consciousness, though often behaving abnormally, erratically, or failing to be coherent
 complete amnesia or assimilating the memory as though it was a normal dream on regaining full consciousness
 dreams of daily life that appear as if they happened in reality, and can cause disorientation upon awakening

Although hallucinations may occur during focal aware seizures they are differentiated from psychotic symptoms by the fact that the person is usually aware that the hallucinations are not real.

Jacksonian march

Jacksonian march or Jacksonian seizure is a phenomenon where a simple partial seizure spreads from the distal part of the limb toward the ipsilateral face (on same side of body). They involve a progression of the location of the seizure in the brain, which leads to a "march" of the motor presentation of symptoms.

Jacksonian seizures are initiated with abnormal electrical activity within the primary motor cortex. They are unique in that they travel through the primary motor cortex in succession, affecting the corresponding muscles, often beginning with the fingers. This is felt as a tingling sensation, or a feeling of waves through the fingers when touched together. It then affects the hand and moves on to more proximal areas on the same side of body. Symptoms often associated with a Jacksonian seizure are sudden head and eye movements, tingling, numbness, smacking of the lips, and sudden muscle contractions. Most of the time any one of these actions can be seen as normal movements, without being associated with the seizure occurring. They occur at no particular moment and last only briefly. They may result in secondary generalized seizure involving both hemispheres. They can also start at the feet, manifesting as tingling or pins and needles, and there are painful cramps in the foot muscles, due to the signals from the brain. Because it is a partial seizure, the postictal state is of normal consciousness.
Jacksonian seizures are named after their discoverer, John Hughlings Jackson, an English neurologist, whose studies led to the discovery of the seizures' initiation point (in the primary motor cortex) in 1863.

Complex partial seizures 

A complex partial seizure is a seizure that is associated with unilateral cerebral hemisphere involvement and causes impairment of awareness or responsiveness, i.e. alteration of consciousness.

Presentation

Complex partial seizures are often preceded by an aura.  The seizure aura is a focal aware seizure.  The aura may manifest itself as a feeling of déjà vu, jamais vu, fear, euphoria or depersonalization.  The aura might also occur as a visual disturbance, such as tunnel vision or a change in the perceived size of objects. Once consciousness is impaired, the person may display automatisms, such as lip smacking, chewing or swallowing. There may also be loss of memory (amnesia) surrounding the seizural event. The person may still be able to perform routine tasks such as walking, although such movements are not purposeful or planned.  Witnesses may not recognize that anything is wrong. The person may or may not even realize that they experienced a seizure.

Complex partial seizures might arise from any lobe of the brain. They most commonly arise from the mesial temporal lobe, particularly the amygdala, hippocampus, and neocortical regions. A common associated brain abnormality is mesial temporal sclerosis. Mesial temporal sclerosis is a specific pattern of hippocampal neuronal loss accompanied by hippocampal gliosis and atrophy.  Complex partial seizures occur when excessive and synchronous electrical brain activity causes the impaired awareness and responsiveness. The abnormal electrical activity might spread to the rest of the brain and cause a focal to bilateral seizure or a generalized tonic–clonic seizure. The newer classification of 2017 groups only focal and generalized seizures, and generalized seizures are those that involve both sides of the brain from the onset.

References

External links 

Seizure types